Nine High a Pallet is the first studio album by brute., a band based in Athens, Georgia, USA, which was a collaboration band between the guitarist Vic Chesnutt and members of Widespread Panic.  The album was recorded at John Keane (record producer)'s studio in Athens, Georgia.

The liner notes to the album suggest that the band's name originated from a comment from Dave Schools who reportedly stated, "Play like a brute."

The liner notes also suggest that the album title derives from the safe stacking height for pallets.

The band Brute played 5 shows under that moniker, and Vic would collaborate with the band several more times before his death.

Several brute. songs have been covered by Widespread Panic over the years since Vic's death, including "Protein Drink/Sewing Machine" and "Bastards in Bubbles."

Track listing
All songs written by Vic Chesnutt, except as shown.
"Westport Ferry" – 2:56
"Blight" (Chesnutt, Houser, Nance, Schools) – 4:07
"Good Morning Mr. Hard on" – 3:46
"I Ain't Crazy Enough"
"Protein Drink/Sewing Machine" ("Sewing Machine" co-written by Tina Chesnutt)
"Let's Get Down to Business"
"George Wallace"
"PC"
"Snowblind" (Hoyt Axton)
"Miserable"
"Bastards in Bubbles"
"Cataclysm" – 8:36

Personnel
brute.
Vic Chesnutt – guitar, vocals, harmonica
John Bell – dobro, vocals
Michael Houser – guitar, vocals
Todd Nance – percussion, drums, vocals
Dave Schools – bass guitar, percussion, vocals
John Hermann – keyboards
Guest performers
John Hickman – harp ("Cataclysm" only)
John Keane – pedal steel guitar ("Snowblind" only)
David Lowery – guitar ("Cataclysm" only)
Production
John Keane – engineer
Scott Stuckey – producer, engineer, mixing, remastering
Don Zientara – mixing

References

External links
 Vic Chestnutt.com
 Widespread Panic.com
 Everyday Companion
 [ All Music entry]

1995 albums
Capricorn Records albums
Nine High a Pallet (brute.)
Vic Chesnutt albums
Collaborative albums